Ralph Lowe (born 8 September 1940) is a Grenadian cricketer. He played in three first-class matches for the Windward Islands in 1969/70.

See also
 List of Windward Islands first-class cricketers

References

External links
 

1940 births
Living people
Grenadian cricketers
Windward Islands cricketers